Geoffrey Keyes (October 30, 1888 – September 17, 1967) was a highly decorated senior United States Army officer who served with distinction in Sicily and Italy during World War II.

Early life

Keyes was born on October 30, 1888, in Fort Bayard, New Mexico, the son of Captain Alexander S. B. Keyes, a United States Army officer, and his wife, Virginia Maxwell Keyes. Like his father, Geoffrey enrolled as a cadet at the United States Military Academy (USMA) at West Point, New York, on March 2, 1908, and graduated on June 12, 1913, being commissioned as a second lieutenant, into the Cavalry Branch of the United States Army. Among his fellow graduates were Charles H. Corlett, William R. Schmidt, Carlos Brewer, Robert L. Spragins, Alexander Patch, Louis A. Craig, Henry Balding Lewis, Lunsford E. Oliver, and Willis D. Crittenberger. His first assignment was with the 6th Cavalry Regiment, where he served until October 1916 and participated in the Pancho Villa Expedition.

Military career
Keyes' next assignment was at the USMA, where he served as an instructor of French language. He was also head football coach for one season in 1917, compiling a record of 7–1.

Keyes' interwar service included duty with the Panama Canal Division as an Assistant Chief of Staff (G-3), instructor at the USMA and the United States Army Cavalry School at Fort Riley, Kansas, and Chief of Supply of Supply Division within War Department. He also graduated from the United States Army Command and General Staff School in 1926 and the United States Army War College in 1937.

World War II
In 1940, during World War II, Keyes was chief of staff of the 2nd Armored Division, which was then commanded by Major General George S. Patton who, like Keyes, was a fellow cavalryman who had served with distinction in World War I and had taken a significant interest in armored warfare. Patton was to think highly of Keyes, later stating that he "had the best tactical mind of any officer I know."

In January 1942, a month after the Japanese attack on Pearl Harbor on December 7, 1941, and the subsequent German declaration of war on the United States, on December 11, Keyes, promoted to the one-star general officer rank of brigadier general on January 15, assumed command of Combat Command 'B' (CCB) of the 3rd Armored Division. In July, now a two-star major general (having been promoted on June 22), he raised the 9th Armored Division and, in September, relinquished command of the division to Major General John W. Leonard, before going to North Africa as Deputy Commander of the I Armored Corps, commanded by Patton, which was later redesignated the Seventh United States Army for the Allied invasion of Sicily.

Keyes was originally serving as deputy commander of the Seventh Army during the campaign, once again serving under Patton, in July 1943. During Operation Husky, when Patton split the Seventh Army in half, Keyes was given command of the Provisional Corps, composed of the 2nd Armored Division, the 3rd Infantry Division and the 82nd Airborne Division, along with two United States Army Ranger battalions, and supporting units. Advancing 125 miles in five days, through difficult mountainous terrain, the corps captured most of Western Sicily, including Palermo, the Sicilian capital, along with some 53,000 Axis soldiers, mainly Italians, along with nearly 600 vehicles, in exchange for less than 300 casualties. The corps then settled down for garrison duties and the administration of western Sicily until it was disbanded on August 20, three days after the end of the campaign. For his actions in the brief Sicilian campaign Keyes was awarded the Army Distinguished Service Medal. General Dwight D. Eisenhower, the Supreme Allied Commander in the Mediterranean Theater of Operations (MTO) wrote to General George C. Marshall, the Chief of Staff of the United States Army, noting that his "reports on Keyes as an acting Corps Commander in the Sicilian affair was most favorable".

In September 1943 Keyes assumed command of the II Corps from Major General John P. Lucas and commanded it throughout the Italian Campaign, landing in Italy in mid-November and serving under Lieutenant General Mark W. Clark's United States Fifth Army. Clark, who was eight years younger than Keyes, had been a fellow student at the United States Army War College in the late 1930s. His first major battle was the Battle of San Pietro Infine and later, with Major General Fred L. Walker's 36th Infantry Division under command, his corps took part in the controversial Battle of Rapido River, part of the first Battle of Monte Cassino. The corps sustained heavy losses in the battle. The corps was then involved in Operation Diadem, the fighting on the Gothic Line and the Spring 1945 offensive in Italy, which ended the fighting in Italy.

Postwar
After the war Keyes commanded the Seventh Army from 1945 to 1946. In December 1945 he was by his friend George S. Patton's side when the latter died. This was followed by command of the United States Third Army, Patton's former command, from 1946 to 1947. In 1947, Keyes was appointed United States High Commissioner on the Allied Council for Austria. He served as Director, Weapons Systems Evaluation Group (WSEG) from 1951 to 1954.

Keyes retired from the army in 1954, after 41 years of service. He died on September 17, 1967, at Walter Reed Hospital in Washington, D.C., just a few weeks short of his 79th birthday. He is interred at West Point Cemetery.

Decorations
Lieutenant General Keyes's ribbon bar:

Head coaching record

Bibliography

References

External links

United States Army Officers 1939−1945

|-

|-

|-

1888 births
1967 deaths
United States Army Cavalry Branch personnel
United States Army Command and General Staff College alumni
Army Black Knights football coaches
Burials at West Point Cemetery
People from Grant County, New Mexico
Recipients of the Distinguished Service Medal (US Army)
Recipients of the Legion of Merit
Recipients of the Silver Star
United States Army War College alumni
United States Military Academy alumni
Recipients of the Czechoslovak War Cross
United States Army personnel of World War I
United States Army generals of World War II
United States Army generals
United States Military Academy faculty
Military personnel from New Mexico